Nikola Krstović (born 5 April 2000) is a Montenegrin professional footballer who plays as a striker for DAC Dunajská Streda of the Fortuna Liga. He is considered to be one of the most promising young talents in Montenegro.

Club career

FK Zeta
On 23 April 2016, Krstović made his competitive debut for Zeta, being assigned the number 13 jersey. He came on as a second-half substitute for Filip Kukuličić in their 1–1 league draw away against Iskra Danilovgrad, becoming the youngest player ever to appear in a 1. CFL game at the age of 16 years and 18 days old. Until the end of the 2015–16 Montenegrin First League, Krstović would go on to play in three more fixtures (all as a substitute) as the club hovered around the middle of the table.

On 5 November 2016, Krstović made his first appearance of the 2016–17 season, entering the field during the second half of a 1–0 home league win over Bokelj. He scored his first senior goals in March of the following year, netting a brace in a 3–0 away victory over Jedinstvo Bijelo Polje, making him the first player born in the 2000s to find the back of the net in the top flight of Montenegrin football. In his first full season at Zeta, Krstović played in 19 games (all in the league) and bagged seven goals.

On 29 June 2017, Krstović appeared as a starter for Zeta wearing the number 9 shirt in a 1–0 away loss to Željezničar Sarajevo in the first leg of the 2017–18 UEFA Europa League first qualifying round. He then scored an equalizer in the return tie a week later at home (the game ended in a 2–2 draw). In October of the same year, Krstović netted his first senior hat-trick and led his team to a 4–2 home win over Kom. He tallied 15 goals in 39 matches across all competitions throughout the season.

Red Star Belgrade
On 25 February 2019, Krstović signed with Serbian club Red Star Belgrade until the summer of 2023 with an option for another year. He remained on loan at Zeta until the end of the season, becoming the Montenegrin First League top scorer with 17 goals.

DAC 1904 Dunajská Streda
On 5 September 2021, DAC has announced the signing of Krstović on a four-year contract. DAC's sporting director Jan Van Daele claimed that DAC had scouted Krstović since his youth years in Montenegro. He was given the jersey number 45. Krstović claimed gladness and honour following the contract signing.

International career
Krstović was capped for Montenegro at all youth levels from under-17 through to under-21. He made his debuts for the national under-21 team at the Valeriy Lobanovskyi Memorial Tournament in June 2017, appearing in both of his side's matches and scoring a brace in a 3–2 victory over Slovenia U21 in the third-place game. Later that year, Krstović netted a goal in a UEFA Under-21 Championship 2019 qualifier away to Bulgaria, as Montenegro suffered a 3–1 loss.

Statistics

Honours
Red Star Belgrade
Serbian SuperLiga: 2020–21
Serbian Cup: 2020–21

Notes

References

External links
 
 
 

2000 births
Living people
People from Podgorica Municipality
Association football forwards
Montenegrin footballers
Montenegro youth international footballers
Montenegro under-21 international footballers
FK Zeta players
Red Star Belgrade footballers
RFK Grafičar Beograd players
FC DAC 1904 Dunajská Streda players
Montenegrin First League players
Serbian SuperLiga players
Slovak Super Liga players
Serbian First League players
Montenegrin expatriate footballers
Expatriate footballers in Serbia
Montenegrin expatriate sportspeople in Serbia
Expatriate footballers in Slovakia
Montenegrin expatriate sportspeople in Slovakia
Montenegrin people of Albanian descent